Xylota quadrimaculata , (Loew, 1866), the Four-spotted Leafwalker , is a common species of syrphid fly observed in central and eastern North America. Syrphid flies are also known as Hover Flies or Flower Flies because the adults are frequently found hovering around flowers from which they feed on nectar and pollen. The larvae of this genus live under bark in sap runs.

Distribution
Canada: Ontario, New Brunswick. 
United States: New York, Minnesota, Wisconsin, Illinois, New Hampshire, Massachusetts, Pennsylvania, Ohio, Iowa, Maine, Colorado, Mississippi, Tennessee, Maryland, New Jersey, Michigan.
GBIF species page

References

Eristalinae
Insects described in 1866
Diptera of North America
Hoverflies of North America
Taxa named by Hermann Loew